Ênio Oliveira Júnior, known as Eninho, (born 16 May 1981) is a Brazilian former professional footballer who played as an attacking midfielder.

Club career 
Eninho was born in Porto Alegre, Rio Grande do Sul. He played for Brazilian clubs Mogi Mirim, São Caetano, Portuguesa, Grêmio, Guarani, Vila Nova, Coruripe, CRB, Murici and Marília, and for South Korean clubs Suwon Samsung Bluewings, Daegu FC, Jeonbuk Hyundai Motors and Chinese club Changchun Yatai.

Changchun Yatai
On 31 July 2013, he made his debut for Yatai in a 1-1 away draw against Qingdao Jonoon in the Chinese Super League. On 21 September 2013, he scored his first goal for the club in a 2-0 home win against Dalian Aerbin. On 30 October 2013, he was sent off in an eventual 2-1 defeat away at Shanghai Shenhua, theremore missing the pivotal final home game against Liaoning Whowin. Yatai eventually won the game 1-0 and successfully stayed up.

Honours
Jeonbuk Hyundai Motors
K League Classic: 2009, 2011

Individual
Korean League Cup top scorer: 2008
K League Best XI: 2009, 2010, 2011

References

External links
 

1981 births
Living people
Footballers from Porto Alegre
Association football midfielders
Brazilian footballers
Brazilian expatriate footballers
Mogi Mirim Esporte Clube players
Associação Desportiva São Caetano players
Suwon Samsung Bluewings players
Associação Portuguesa de Desportos players
Grêmio Foot-Ball Porto Alegrense players
Guarani FC players
Vila Nova Futebol Clube players
Clube de Regatas Brasil players
Murici Futebol Clube players
Marília Atlético Clube players
Daegu FC players
Jeonbuk Hyundai Motors players
Changchun Yatai F.C. players
Ceará Sporting Club players
Campeonato Brasileiro Série B players
K League 1 players
Chinese Super League players
Expatriate footballers in South Korea
Expatriate footballers in China
Brazilian expatriate sportspeople in South Korea
Brazilian expatriate sportspeople in China